Paruna is a town in eastern South Australia.

Purana is an aboriginal word meaning "stopping place".

The government town of Paruna was proclaimed on 23 July 1914 on land in the cadastral unit of the Hundred of Kekwick to the immediate north of the Paruna Railway Station. The locality's boundaries were created on 28 September 2000 with the site of the government town of Paruna being located in its approximate centre.

The Barmera railway line from Adelaide was opened to Paruna on 1 May 1913 and a further 11 km to Meribah within the week. It was later extended north to Paringa then across the Paringa Bridge to Renmark and Barmera, but has now been closed and removed.

Paruna School operated between 1917 and 1965, and Paruna North School between 1925 and 1941. Brown's Well District Area School closed in 2007. The effects of prolonged drought and the movement of population to larger centres has led to the closure of a number of other facilities over recent years, including the general store and the golf club.

Paruna was the seat of the District Council of Brown's Well until a merger that created the District Council of Loxton Waikerie in 1997.

The 2016 Australian census which was conducted in August 2016 reports that Paruna had a population of 53 people.

Paruna is located within the federal division of Barker, the state electoral district of Chaffey and the local government area of the District Council of Loxton Waikerie.

Gallery

References

External links

Towns in South Australia